Smith Creek, Smiths Creek or Smith's Creek may refer to:

Streams

United States
One of at least 417 streams in the United States named "Smith's Creek" or "Smith Creek" (see USGS source below), including:
Smith Creek (San Tomas Aquino Creek tributary), a tributary of San Tomas Aquino Creek, in Santa Clara County, California
Smith Creek (Arroyo Hondo tributary), a tributary of Arroyo Hondo in Santa Clara County, California
Smith Creek (Chattahoochee River), a tributary to the Chattahoochee River in northern Georgia
Smith Creek (Iowa River), a river in Iowa
Smith Creek (Missouri River), a river in Missouri
Smith Creek (Nebraska), a river in Jefferson County
Smith Creek (Lander County, Nevada), a stream in Nevada
Smiths Creek (Deep River tributary), a stream in Lee County, North Carolina
Smith Creek (Crow Creek), a stream in South Dakota
Smith Creek (Virginia), a tributary of the North Fork of the Shenandoah River
Smith Creek (Coal River), a stream in West Virginia

Elsewhere
Smiths Creek (New South Wales), a stream in Sydney

Communities in the United States
Smiths Creek, Kentucky, an unincorporated community in Carter County
Smith's Creek, Michigan, a civil township in St. Clair County